Cigaritis iza, the black silverline, is a butterfly in the family Lycaenidae. It is found in Guinea, Sierra Leone, Liberia, Ivory Coast and Ghana. The habitat consists of forests.

References

External links
Die Gross-Schmetterlinge der Erde 13: Die Afrikanischen Tagfalter. Plate XIII 69 g

Butterflies described in 1865
Cigaritis
Butterflies of Africa
Taxa named by William Chapman Hewitson